A loutrophoros (Ancient Greek: λουτροφόρος; Greek etymology: λουτρόν/loutron and φέρω/pherō, English translation: "bathwater" and "carry") is a distinctive type of Greek pottery vessel characterized by an elongated neck with two handles. The loutrophoros was used to carry water for a bride's pre-nuptial ritual bath, and in funeral rituals, and was placed in the tombs of the unmarried. The loutrophoros itself is a motif for Greek tombstones, either as a relief (for instance, the lekythos on the Stele of Panaetius) or as a stone vessel. There are many in the funeral area at the Kerameikos in Athens, some of which are now preserved in the National Archaeological Museum of Athens.

See also
 Ancient Greek vase painting
 Pottery of ancient Greece

References

Sources
Richter, Gisela M. A. (1928). A Newly Acquired Loutrophoros. The Metropolitan Museum of Art Bulletin, Vol. 23, No. 2, Part 1, pp. 54–57.

External links

Image of the Relief-Loutrophoros of Panaetius

Ancient Greek pot shapes